Camponotus altivagans is a species of carpenter ant (genus Camponotus) found in Haiti and the Greater Antilles.

References

altivagans
Hymenoptera of North America
Insects described in 1936